The 1951 Washington and Lee Generals football team was an American football team that represented the Washington and Lee University as a member of the Southern Conference (SoCon) during the 1951 college football season. Led by George T. Barclay in his third and final season as head coach, the Generals compiled an overall record of 6–4 with a mark of 5–1 in conference play, tying for third place in the SoCon.

Schedule

References

Washington and Lee
Washington and Lee Generals football seasons
Washington and Lee Generals football